Pingchuan District is a district of the city of Baiyin, Gansu province of the People's Republic of China. It is located about 65 km northeast of Baiyin city centre. The district was established in 1985, being part of Jingyuan County before then.

Economy
It is a major centre for coal production in Gansu, producing over 12 million tonnes of coal annually. Pingchuan is also rich in clay deposits, and has a large ceramics industry, outputting US$81 million a year.

Until 2019, Pingchuan was designated a 'poverty-stricken county' by the Gansu provincial government.

Administrative divisions 
Pingchuan is subdivided in the following administrative divisions:
4 Subdistricts

6 Towns

2 Townships
 Zhongtian Township
 Fuxing Township

Culture
Food
 Black donkey meat hotpot
 Liangpi
 Saozi noodles
 Lamb meat dishes

Transport
 G6 Beijing–Lhasa Expressway
 China National Highway 109
 Honghui railway

See also
 List of administrative divisions of Gansu

References

 Official website (Chinese)

Pingchuan District
Baiyin